Macromya is a genus of bristle flies in the family Tachinidae. There are about eight described species in Macromya.

Species
These eight species belong to the genus Macromya:
 Macromya anthemon Walker, 1849 c g
 Macromya cilipes (Macquart, 1843) c
 Macromya ciniscula Reinhard, 1968 c g
 Macromya connectans (Townsend, 1912) c g
 Macromya crocata Reinhard, 1968 i c g b
 Macromya depressa Robineau-Desvoidy, 1830 c g
 Macromya lucens Reinhard, 1968 c g
 Macromya pyrrhaspis (Wiedemann, 1830) c g
Data sources: i = ITIS, c = Catalogue of Life, g = GBIF, b = Bugguide.net

References

Further reading

External links

 
 

Tachininae